Andrea Ettore Spognardi (October 18, 1908 – January 1, 2000) was a Major League Baseball infielder who played for the Boston Red Sox during the last month of the 1932 season, in which the Red Sox finished in last place, 54 games behind the league champion New York Yankees. The Boston College athlete had never played in the minor leagues before his first Red Sox appearance, when he substituted in a game they were losing 15-0 in Philadelphia.
  
In 17 games as a second baseman, shortstop and third baseman he handled 52 of 53 chances successfully for a fielding percentage of .981. He hit .294 (10-for-34), and 6 bases on balls raised his on-base percentage up to .400. He scored 9 runs and had 1 run batted in. 

Spognardi died in his hometown of Boston, Massachusetts, at the age of 91.

External links
Baseball Reference
Retrosheet

Major League Baseball infielders
Baseball players from Massachusetts
Boston Red Sox players
1908 births
2000 deaths
Major League Baseball second basemen
Watertown Townies players